Apollo: Atmospheres and Soundtracks is a studio album by the British musician and producer Brian Eno with Daniel Lanois and Roger Eno. It was released on 29 July 1983 by EG Records. It was written by Eno in collaboration with his brother Roger Eno and co-producer Daniel Lanois, and is performed by the three of them. The music was originally written for For All Mankind, a documentary film by Al Reinert about the Apollo program, though the film was not released until 1989.

Music from the album has appeared in the films 28 Days Later, Traffic, Trainspotting, and The Lovely Bones, whose soundtrack sold approximately four million copies. Two of the songs from the album, "Silver Morning" and "Deep Blue Day", were issued as a 7" single on EG Records.

Overview
The music was originally composed in 1983 for a documentary film, For All Mankind, that was released in 1989.

The tracks from the album that remain on the final edit of the film are:
 "Always Returning"
 "Drift"
 "Silver Morning"
 "Stars"
 "Under Stars"
 "The Secret Place"
 "An Ending (Ascent)"

The newer tracks from the film that are not on the album (but appear on Music for Films III) are:
 "Sirens" (Brian Eno, Daniel Lanois)
 "Theme for 'Opera'" (Brian Eno, Roger Eno)
 "Fleeting Smile" (Roger Eno)
 "Tension Block" (Daniel Lanois)
 "Asian River" (Brian Eno)
 "Quixote" (Roger Eno)
 "4-Minute Warning" (John Paul Jones)
 "For Her Atoms" (Lydia Kavina (Theremin), Misha Malin)

In the liner notes, Eno describes his experience of watching the Apollo 11 landing in 1969 and his sense that the strangeness of the event was compromised by the low quality of the television transmission and an excess of journalists' commentary. He thus wished to avoid the melodramatic and uptempo way the event was presented.

The album was released on 29 July 1983 by EG Records. A release in the US followed in September 1983.

On 19 July 2019, in celebration of the 50th anniversary of the Apollo 11 moon landing, a special version of the album was released, featuring the remastered original, as well as an accompanying album of 11 new instrumental compositions by Brian Eno, Roger Eno & Daniel Lanois that reimagine the soundtrack to For All Mankind.

Album cover photograph
The orbital photograph of the lunar surface is a hand held Hasselblad-camera photograph made during the mission of Apollo 17 in December 1972. The ID-number of the photograph is AS17-150-23069 (Magazine 150-LL). It shows a closeup view of the most southern section of Mare Serenitatis on the eastern part of the moon's near side. Also visible are Promontorium Archerusia (the oblong system of hills), Brackett (the shallow crater), Dorsum Nicol (the wrinkle ridge), Rimae Plinius (the three grooves), and the northern part of the rim of the pronounced crater Plinius. On the cover of the album, the upper margin of the orbital Hasselblad photograph is rotated 90 degrees to the right. Also visible on the cover photograph is the brightness of Mare Serenitatis to the north (rightward) of the shallow crater Brackett and Rimae Plinius. When observed through a telescope, this region shows a subtle yellowish or tannish grey color. The region to the south (leftward) of Mare Serenitatis shows a subtle bluish grey, which is the overall color of Mare Tranquillitatis. On the cover of the album, these subtle real colors are not reproduced, only the abrupt change of brightness is visible.

Hasselblad photograph AS17-150-23069 is also seen as Figure 59 in Part 1 of Chapter 4 (The Maria) in NASA SP-362: Apollo Over The Moon, a view from orbit.

Small photograph
The small photograph on the back side of the LP cover is AS14-73-10116, made during the mission of Apollo 14 in February 1971. It shows small sections of the walled plains Fra Mauro and Bonpland. The grooves on the floors of both walled plains are known as Rimae Parry. The distinct and largest one of the small bowl shaped craters in this photograph is Fra Mauro F.

Music
The album contains a variety of styles. "Under Stars", "The Secret Place", "Matta", "Signals", "Under Stars II", and "Stars" are all dark, complicated textures similar to those on Eno's previous album Ambient 4/On Land. "An Ending (Ascent)", "Drift", and "Always Returning" are smoother electronic pieces. "Silver Morning", "Deep Blue Day", and "Weightless" are country–inspired ambient pieces featuring Daniel Lanois on pedal steel guitar.

Country music, which Eno listened to as a child in Woodbridge on American armed forces radio, was used to "give the impression of weightless space."

"Under Stars" is a recurring theme in the album, first appearing as an ambient electronic bed behind a treated guitar. "Under Stars II" is the same composition, but with different effects and treatments. "Stars" is the pure background texture without the guitar.

The track "An Ending (Ascent)" was sampled in the song "Hear Me Out" by the group Frou Frou, in "Forgive" by British producer Burial, in "Ascent" by Michael Dow, a London electronic music producer, and in "The Ending" by British DJ Graham Gold. It has also been used in several films, such as Traffic and 28 Days Later, and in the London Olympiad opening (the memorial wall section).

Many of the tracks on the album were recorded with soft "attacks" of each note, then played backwards, with multiple heavy echoes and reverb added in both directions to merge the notes into one long flowing sound with each note greatly overlapping each adjacent note, producing the "floating" effects that Eno desired.

Eno used the Yamaha DX7 synthesiser extensively However, it's also been said by engineer Daniel Lanois that a Yamaha CS-80 was used on "Deep Blue Day". Eno once stated regarding the soundtrack: "...so many processings and reprocessings – it's a bit like making soup from the leftovers of the day before, which in turn was made from leftovers..." Eno said, ".... Well, I love that music anyway .... what I find impressive about that music is that it's very concerned with space in a funny way. Its sound is the sound of a mythical space, the mythical American frontier space that doesn’t really exist anymore. That's why on Apollo I thought it very appropriate, because it's very much like 'space music' — it has all the connotations of pioneering, of the American myth of the brave individual...."

Live version
In the summer of 2009 a live version of the album was performed at two concerts in the IMAX cinema of London's Science Museum and in an arrangement by South Korean composer Woojun Lee for the ensemble Icebreaker with featured artist B J Cole on pedal steel guitar. The album was performed in its entirety, with the tracks in a different order, to a silent and edited version of For All Mankind, closer to the original conception than the released version of the film. A revised version was performed twice at the 2010 Brighton Festival, where Eno was guest artistic director, before subsequent touring in the UK, Ireland and mainland Europe.

Due to the heavily processed nature of the studio-based sound on the original tracks, an exact reproduction would have been impossible to reproduce in a live context, so Woojun Lee chose to apply a free interpretation of the sound world and to make an impression of the original tracks through use of Icebreaker's instrumental resources.

The performances from Brighton were recorded and an album of the live interpretation was released in June 2012.

Track listing

Personnel
 Musicians: Brian Eno, Daniel Lanois, Roger Eno
 Cover art by Russell Mills
 Mastered by Greg Calbi at Sterling Sound
 2019 remaster by Miles Showell at Abbey Road

Versions

Charts

Certifications

Uses in other media

 "An Ending (Ascent)":
 Concert – Coldplay Live at the Royal Albert Hall (2014), intro music
 TV – London 2012 opening ceremony, during a sequence where a collection of photographs of lost loved ones of stadium guests and terrorism victims was shown
 TV – James May on the Moon, opening sequence
 TV – Chris Morris's surreal TV comedy series Jam
 TV – American drama Nip/Tuck, in numerous episodes
 TV – Top Gear (Series 13 Episode 7), during the final sequence of the series and closing credits as Jeremy Clarkson drives the Aston Martin Vantage V12
 TV advertisement – for Cancer Research UK
 TV advertisement - for BMW
 TV – BBC 9/11 10th anniversary
 Film soundtrack – Traffic (2000)
 Film soundtrack – Ghosts of Cité Soleil (2006)
 Film soundtrack – 28 Days Later (2002)
 Film soundtrack – Drive (2011)
 Film soundtrack – Clean (2004)
 Film soundtrack – Beatriz at Dinner (2017)
 Museum exhibit - The National WWII Museum, New Orleans, LA
 "Deep Blue Day":
 Film soundtrack – Trainspotting
 TV – Chris Morris's surreal TV comedy series Jam
 "Always Returning":
 Film soundtrack – Me and Earl and the Dying Girl.
 Film soundtrack – Love.
 "Weightless":
 Film soundtrack – Static.
 "The Secret Place": 
 Film soundtrack –  The Lovely Bones.

References 

Works cited

External links 

 

Brian Eno soundtracks
1983 soundtrack albums
Albums produced by Brian Eno
Albums produced by Daniel Lanois
E.G. Records albums
Brian Eno compilation albums
1983 compilation albums
Soundtrack compilation albums